The 1990 Superbike World Championship was the third FIM Superbike World Championship season. The season started on 18 March at Jerez and finished on 18 November at Manfeild Autocourse after 13 rounds.

Frenchman Raymond Roche won the riders' championship and Honda won the manufacturers' championship.

Race calendar and results

Entry list

Championship standings

Riders' standings

Manufacturers' standings

Notes
 The points allocation system was: 1st=20, 2nd=17, 3rd=15, 4th=13, 5th=11, 6th=10, 7th=9, 8th=8, 9th=7, 10th=6, 11th=5, 12th=4, 13th=3, 14th=2, 15th=1

Superbike racing
Superbike World Championship seasons